This is a list of the National Register of Historic Places listings in Matagorda County, Texas.

This is intended to be a complete list of properties and districts listed on the National Register of Historic Places in Matagorda County, Texas. There are two districts and ten individual properties listed on the National Register in the county. Nine individually listed properties are designated Recorded Texas Historic Landmarks while one district contains additional Recorded Texas Historic Landmarks.

Current listings

The locations of National Register properties and districts may be seen in a mapping service provided.

|}

See also

National Register of Historic Places listings in Texas
Recorded Texas Historic Landmarks in Matagorda County

References

External links

Registered Historic Places
Matagorda County
Buildings and structures in Matagorda County, Texas